Gautam is a surname of Nepalese origin modified from the anterior surname Gotāmé and the original homeland of the surname identified as Gotamkot in western Nepal.

Origin 
Due to religious prosecutions initiated by the Muslim conquest in the Indian subcontinent, it is believed that Kāshidās - a learned scholar and versed in the four Vedas, arrived in Sinja of the Khasa Kingdom from medieval India around 12th century CE "to protect Dharma" and was received with royal respect and honor by the King of Sinja. Descendants of Kāshidās were given a land grant in Gotamkot of present-day western Nepal from where the surname originates.

Kāshidās was a descendant of Ritubhadra, a learned Vedic scholar in the ancient Indian city of Kanyakubja (Kannauj). An inscription in the Shiva temple in Dang Valley mentions in Sanskrit that Kāshidās arrived to Sinja from Kanyakubja (Kannauj) with his disciples "to protect Dharma" and was given royal respect and land grant by the Sinja King.

Notable Nepali persons
Atithi Gautam K. C, Nepalese singer
Atul Gautam, Nepalese musician
Bamdev Gautam, Former Deputy PM of Nepal
Dhruba Chandra Gautam, Nepalese novelist
Kalyan Gautam, Nepalese radio jockey
Kul Gautam, Former UN vice secretary general from Nepal
Rishikesh Gautam, Nepalese politician
Sanjay Gautam, Nepalese politician
Shiv Raj Gautam, Nepalese politician
Sudarshan Gautam, Nepalese mountaineer
Tirtha Gautam, Nepalese politician

References 

Nepali-language surnames
Hindu surnames